F. Weber & Company, Inc. is an American manufacturer and supplier of artists' materials. Established in 1853 in Philadelphia, Pennsylvania, the F. Weber Company, Inc. is the oldest and one of the largest manufacturers of art materials in the United States.

Background
A successor company to Janentzky & Weber Manufacturers & Importers, F. Weber & Company, Inc. was established in 1853, and has been known for quality and innovation throughout its history, for example in the late 19th and early 20th centuries—the golden years of the prestigious World Fair—F. Weber & Co. frequently won gold medals for its fine quality products. Exhibitions included: 1873 Vienna; 1876 Centennial Exposition, Philadelphia; 1893 Columbian Exposition, Chicago; 1903 Louisiana Purchase Exposition, St. Louis; 1915 Panama-Pacific Exposition, San Francisco; and 1926 Sesqui-Centennial Exposition, Philadelphia.

Following the death of Fredrick W. Weber Sr. in 1919, his two sons Fred W. Weber and Ernest Weber had the company incorporated and renamed it F. Weber Co., Inc. Fred W. Weber was a successful artist, chemist, inventor, and businessman, he was responsible for much of the innovation in product development from taking over in 1919 to his retirement in 1967. With his long list of innovations, a majority of which decreased the toxicity of necessary painting supplies, Fred W. Weber elevated the company to further prominence in the US art supplies market. His expertise in the arts as well as science along with the publication of his first book "Artists Pigments" (Van Nostrand 1923) made him a desirable lecturer on the topic of art. He provided advice to many celebrated 20th century artists, including: Thomas Hart Benton, Dean Cornwell, Arthur Dove, Peter Hurd, Norman Rockwell, NC Wyeth, and Andrew Wyeth. At this time the company had its factory and headquarters in Philadelphia, Pennsylvania, and retail locations in Philadelphia, Baltimore, and St. Louis.

The company was bought by Visual Art Industries of Brooklyn, NY in 1980. Honoring the Weber family, the name was not removed from the company. The company is now officially the Martin F. Weber Co. and still produces a variety of art supplies, including the original non-toxic white color "Permalba" formulated by Fred W. Weber himself in 1921. The modern company is also known for its artists signature kits designed for revered television artists such as Jon Gnagy, Bob Ross, Susan Schewe, Robert Wyland and Bruce Blitz.

See also
 List of pen types, brands and companies

References

Further reading
 F. Weber & Company records, 1865-1973. Getty Research Institute.

External links
 "F. Weber and Co. Records," (collection). Oakland, California: Online Archive of California, retrieved online May 22, 2019.
 "F. Weber & Co., Inc. records, 1865-1973." Getty Research Institute, Los Angeles, California. Accession No. 950018. Records contain trade catalogs and price lists, paint formula books, sample books, and business papers, trade catalogs and sample books of other companies, and lectures written and delivered by F. Weber.

Manufacturing companies based in Philadelphia
American companies established in 1853
Visual arts materials